HD 196737, also designated as HR 7893, is a solitary orange hued star located in the southern constellation Microscopium. It has an apparent magnitude of 5.47, allowing it to be faintly visible to the naked eye. At its current distance, HD 196737's brightness is diminished by 0.14 magnitudes due to interstellar dust. It has an absolute magnitude of 1.17.

This is an evolved giant star with a stellar classification of K1 III. HD 196737 is estimated to be 3.4 billion years old based on asteroseismologic measurements,enough for it to cool and expand onto the red giant branch; it is now fusing a hydrogen shell around an inert helium core. HD 196737 has a solar metallicity — what astronomers dub chemical elements heavier than helium. The star has a projected rotational velocity too low to be measured accurately.

References

K-type giants
Microscopium
Microscopii, 13
CD-33 15119
196737
102014
7893